Runaway Bay is a city in Wise County, Texas, lying at the Southern end of Lake Bridgeport. The population was 1,546 in 2020.

Geography
Runaway Bay is located at  (33.175379, −97.874794).

The city is built around an 18-hole golf course and the city's main water tower resembles a golf ball on a tee.

Demographics

As of the 2020 United States census, there were 1,546 people, 734 households, and 501 families residing in the city.

Golf course
The Club at Runaway Bay is an 18-hole golf course and club house designed by Leon Howard and established in 1969. It is Par 72, length 7032 yards and has a course rating of 73.1. It was featured in the 2008–09 edition of Golf Digest as one of the "Best Places to Play."

Alleged chupacabra sighting
On January 17, 2010, the golf course was the subject of a chupacabra sighting in which the unidentified dead animal was described as a "brown, earth-colored creature is hairless with oversized canines and elongated padded feet with inch-long toes tapered with sharp, curved claws. The creature also had long hind legs." Upon investigation, a biologist with the Texas Parks and Wildlife Department identified the animal as a hairless raccoon.

Education
The City of Runaway Bay is served by the Bridgeport Independent School District.

Highways

References

Cities in Wise County, Texas
Cities in Texas
Dallas–Fort Worth metroplex